Daphne Van De Zande (born 21 July 1974 in Vilvoorde) is a former Belgian tennis player.

She has career-high WTA rankings of 161 in singles, achieved on 22 June 1998, and 210 in doubles, reached on 5 October 1998. Van De Zande won four singles and three doubles titles on the ITF Circuit in her career.

She made her WTA Tour main-draw debut at the 1997 Volvo Women's Open.

Van De Zande retired from professional tennis 2011.

ITF Circuit finals

Singles: 8 (4 titles, 4 runner-ups)

Doubles: 6 (3 titles, 3 runner-ups)

External links
 
 

1974 births
Living people
Belgian female tennis players
People from Vilvoorde
Sportspeople from Flemish Brabant
20th-century Belgian women